Diodorus Tuldenus, born Theodoor van Tulden (died 16 November, 1645) was regius professor of Civil Law at the University of Leuven.

Life
Tuldenus was born in 's-Hertogenbosch at an unknown date in the late 16th century, the son of Nicolas Van Tulden, a lawyer who served on the city council. He then attended the University of Leuven, where he studied moral and political philosophy under Erycius Puteanus and thereafter law. Graduating in 1615, he returned to 's-Hertogenbosch and joined the city administration. In 1620 he obtained the chair in civil law at the university, with dispensation for his lack of a doctorate. He obtained the doctorate of law in 1633. In 1645 he was appointed to the Great Council of Mechelen, the highest court of appeal in the Spanish Netherlands. He died in Mechelen on 16 November 1645, only four months after taking up the position.

He was married to Catherine-Claire van Grevenbroeck, and one of their sons, Florent Tuldenus, later himself became a councillor of the Great Council.

Works

 Dissertationum Socraticarum libri duo. Leuven, 1620.
 De principiis jurisprudentiae libri quatuor. Leuven, P. Dormalius, 1621
 Ad Institutionum juris civilis Imperatoris Justiniani libros quatuor commentarius. Leuven, 1622. A commentary on the Institutes of Justinian, dedicated to Jacobus Boonen.
 De causis corruptorum judiciorum et remediis libri quatuor. Cologne, 1624. Dedicated to the States of Brabant. 
 De jurisprudentia extemporali sive series regularum. 2 vols., Leuven, 1628-1629.
 De cognitione sui libri quinque. Leuven, 1630. Dedicated to Antwerp city council.
 Initiamenta jurisprudentiae tredecim orationibus auspicalibus comprehensa. Leuven, 1633. Dedicated to Frans I van Kinschot.
 Commentarius ad codicem Justinianeum. Louvain, 1651. A commentary on the Codex Justinianus.
 Opera omnia. 4 vols., Leuven, Gilles Denique, 1702–1712.

Editions 
 Commentary on the Institutes (1628 edition) on Google Books
 Commentary on the Codex Justinianus (1650 edition) on Google Books

References

External links

Year of birth unknown
1645 deaths
People from 's-Hertogenbosch
17th-century Latin-language writers
Academic staff of the Old University of Leuven
Scholars of Roman law
Dutch legal scholars
Belgian legal scholars